Apple II text mode uses the 7-bit ASCII (us-ascii) character set. The high-bit is set to display in normal mode on the 40x24 text screen.

Character sets

Apple II / Apple II plus 
The original Signetics 2513 character generator chip has 64 glyphs for upper case, numbers, symbols, and punctuation characters. Each 5x7 pixel bitmap matrix is displayed in a 7x8 character cell on the text screen. The 64 characters can be displayed in INVERSE in the range $00 to $3F, FLASHing in the range $40 to $7F, and NORMAL mode in the range $80 to $FF. Normal mode characters are repeated in the $80 to $FF range.

To display lowercase letters, applications can run in the graphics modes and use custom fonts, rather than running in text mode using the font in ROM.

Apple IIe

Apple IIc

Apple IIc alternate

Apple IIGS 
Apple II MouseText character set

References

External links 
 Typography in 8 bits: System fonts
 Video ROMs

Character sets
Apple II computers